José Ramón López (born 22 November 1950) is a Spanish sprint canoer who competed in the mid to late 1970s. He won a silver medal in the K-4 1000 m event at the 1976 Summer Olympics in Montreal.

López also won six medals at the ICF Canoe Sprint World Championships with a gold (K-4 1000 m: 1975), a silver (K-4 500 m: 1978), and four bronzes (K-1 4 x 500 m: 1975, K-4 500 m: 1977, K-4 1000 m: 1977, 1978).

References

1950 births
Canoeists at the 1976 Summer Olympics
Living people
Olympic canoeists of Spain
Olympic silver medalists for Spain
Spanish male canoeists
Olympic medalists in canoeing
ICF Canoe Sprint World Championships medalists in kayak
Medalists at the 1976 Summer Olympics
20th-century Spanish people